The Art of Heraldry: An Encyclopædia of Armory is a book on heraldry and armory by Arthur Charles Fox-Davies, originally published in 1904.

Description 
The book was originally conceived as an English translation of Ströhl's Heraldischer Atlas, written in German. However, in Fox-Davies' hands, it was so much transformed and expanded that it became a largely original work specifically directed to the history, theory and practice of English heraldry, with illustrations in black and white and in colour throughout. The parts written by Ströhl were translated to English by Fox-Davies's sister Grace Muriel Fox-Davies, while Fox-Davies himself wrote other chapters in whole or in part and other chapters were written in whole or in part by heraldists such as the then Lyon King of Arms Sir James Balfour Paul, the then Richmond Herald C.H. Athill, Cyril Davenport, Albert Hartshorne and Walter J. Kaye.

Apart from the illustrations by Ströhl, the book also included heraldic drawings specially commissioned for heraldic records published by Fox-Davies.

This large 500-page book was re-issued in black and white only in 1976 by an American publisher and in 1986 in colour by a London publisher. Much of the material in this book was re-used in a shorter, cheaper and more popular exposition of contemporary English heraldic practice, Complete Guide to Heraldry, which proved very successful and influential. This too has been reprinted several times. Another even shorter guide was Heraldry Explained, but even this balanced a clear and didactic text with plentiful illustration.

Fox-Davies died in 1928 (and Ströhl died in 1919), so the book is now in public domain, the copyright having expired in 1998.

References

External links
 The Art of Heraldry: An Encyclopædia of Armory on Google Books, accessed on 22 October 2013 and on 4 January 2014
 The Art of Heraldry: An Encyclopædia of Armory on Internet Archive, accessed on 4 January 2014

Literature on heraldry